The Henpecked Duck is a Warner Bros. Looney Tunes cartoon directed by Bob Clampett and written by Warren Foster. The cartoon was released on August 30, 1941, and stars Porky Pig and Daffy Duck.

The film is set in a court room, where Daffy tries to save his marriage after losing his wife's egg.

Plot
Porky Pig presides as judge over divorce proceedings at the "Court of Inhuman Relations." He calls the case of "Duck vs. Duck." Daffy and Mrs. Duck approach the judge's stand. Mrs. Duck shouts over and over: "I want a divorce!" while also hurling disparaging remarks and insults at Daffy for what led to her decision and not letting him get a word in edgewise to prove his innocence or apologize.

Porky asks her to relate to the court what happened. She explains that she had left Daffy in charge of keeping their egg warm while she visited her mother. Daffy grew bored, so he took the egg and performed a magic trick, causing the egg to disappear and then reappear. Impressed with himself, he tried the trick a second time but was unable to make the egg reappear. Despite countless frantic attempts with his trick, the egg never reappeared. When Mrs. Duck returned home, Daffy had replaced the egg with a door knob, hoping to fool her. She discovers this, and ends her story by shouting "I want a divorce!" once more, but this time, not in a blind rage, but extremely close to tears.

Porky then sternly asks Daffy what he has to say for himself. Daffy pleads for one more chance to try and get the egg to reappear before Porky goes through with signing off on the divorce papers, and Porky grants his request, to the shock of Mrs. Duck and the courtroom. In tears, he tries the trick again and the egg reappears, much to the court's amazement. The egg immediately hatches and the ducks reconcile their differences. Junior, seated on the judge's podium with his glasses and Porky's gavel, then says, "Case dismissed, step down!", hitting the gavel twice at the end of the cartoon.

References

External links

Looney Tunes shorts
Warner Bros. Cartoons animated short films
1941 films
1941 animated films
1941 short films
Films directed by Bob Clampett
1941 comedy films
American courtroom films
Daffy Duck films
Porky Pig films
American black-and-white films
1940s Warner Bros. animated short films